Oded is a Hebrew name meaning "encouragement".

People with the name Oded:
Oded Baloush, Israeli footballer
Oded Brandwein (born 1988), Israeli-Polish professional basketball player in the Israeli Premier League
Oded Burla (1915–2009), Israeli
Oded Elkayam (born 1988), Israeli footballer
Oded Fehr (born 1970), Israeli actor
Oded Gavish (born 1989), Israeli footballer
Oded Golan (born 1951), Israeli
Oded Goldreich (born 1957)
 Oded Ha-Carmeili, later Eddie Carmel (1936–1972), Israeli-born entertainer with gigantism and acromegaly, popularly known as "The Jewish Giant"
Oded Liphshitz, Israeli playwright
Oded Lipschits (born 1963), Israeli archaeologist and historian
Oded Lowengart, Israel professor of marketing 
Oded Menashe (born 1969), Israeli actor and magician
Oded Kattash (born 1974), Israeli basketball player and coach
Oded Machnes (born 1956), Israeli football player
Oded Schramm (1961–2008), Israeli-American mathematician

In the Bible, there were two people called Oded: 
Oded (father of Azariah)
Oded (prophet)